Ernst Ammann (born 24 January 1941) is a retired Swiss hammer thrower. He competed at the 1968 Summer Olympics and placed 19th; his wife Sieglinde competed alongside in the pentathlon and long jump.

References

Swiss male hammer throwers
1941 births
Living people
Olympic athletes of Switzerland
Athletes (track and field) at the 1968 Summer Olympics
Sportspeople from Thurgau